The A14 "Adriatic" is the second-longest Italian motorway. Its northern end is Bologna (on the bypass with the "Tyrrhenian" A1) and its southern ending is at Taranto, bordering the Adriatic coast and unifying historical local roads.

Inaugurated in 1965, it passes through or near Rimini, Riccione, Cesenatico, Cattolica, Pesaro, Ancona, Civitanova, San Benedetto del Tronto, Pescara, Vasto, Termoli, Foggia and Bari.

History

The first part of the A14 opened to traffic was Bologna-Forlì (73 km) in 1966 and the connection to the "Tyrrhenian" A1. In 1969 was reached Ancona, and the approximately 50 km section in Abruzzo was also opened. In 1973 the motorway was completed from Bologna to Bari (absorbing parts of A17) and for the spur for Ravenna. The final extension towards Taranto finally opened in 1975.

Route

A14
Transport in Emilia-Romagna
Transport in le Marche
Transport in Abruzzo
Transport in Molise
Transport in Apulia